A. S. Ensworth served as a member of the 1859-60 California State Assembly, representing the 1st District.

References

Year of birth missing
Year of death missing
Members of the California State Assembly